200 Press is the sixth solo EP by English musician James Blake. Blake played all the instruments and produced the record. It was released on 1-800-Dinosaur on 8 December 2014. The name of the album (and the name of the title track) are a reference to the fact that only 200 copies of the vinyl edition would be pressed.

Composition
200 Press contains further experimentation by Blake. He most notably used a sample of Andre 3000's verse from Devin the Dude's "What a Job".

The final track, "Words That We Both Know" is a poem set to disjointed piano.

Reception

The album received general acclaim from critics, mainly praising Blake's continued exploration and inventiveness. Consequence of Sound praised Blake for this, saying "... it’s refreshing to see Blake immerse himself in experimentation."

AbsolutePunk gave the album an 8.5/10, stating "The music contained on 200 Press is some of the most forward thinking stuff James Blake has done yet".

Track listing

Personnel
 James Blake – writing, recording, production

References

2014 EPs
Albums produced by James Blake (musician)
James Blake (musician) albums